Richmond Parkway (originally Richmond Bypass) is an arterial road connecting Interstate 580 and Interstate 80 through Richmond, California.  The road allows drivers traveling between Marin County (to the west) and Solano County (to the north) to bypass central Richmond.

History

The original idea for Richmond Parkway came from a state proposal for State Route 93 in the early 1980s. When the state did not implement the plan, local officials assembled $200 million in state and local funds to fund a road largely following the same route as proposed Route 93, which was built in the 1990s.

While it mostly functions as an expressway, parts of Richmond Parkway do not meet state expressway standards. For this reason, Caltrans has refused to take it over and officially designate it as part of SR 93 until these local officials bring it up to the state's standards.

Major intersections

See also

References

External links

CCTA Measure C Project #1300: Richmond Parkway
Richmond Parkway Call Box Service Begins - MTC

Streets in Richmond, California